Darren Uyenoyama (born October 15, 1979) is an American professional mixed martial artist currently competing for Pacific Xtreme Combat in the Flyweight division. A professional competitor since 2002, Uyenoyama has formerly competed for the Ultimate Fighting Championship, Strikeforce, DREAM, DEEP, and Shooto.

Background
Uyenoyama was born and raised in San Francisco/South San Francisco area, and is a third-generation Japanese-American. Uyenoyama attended El Camino High School where he participated in wrestling. He also wrestled at Skyline College and was studying Kinesiology. He began training at Ralph Gracie's Brazilian jiu-jitsu academy while attending college. Uyenoyama had a successful career in BJJ, winning tournaments, and eventually transitioned his skills to mixed martial arts.

Mixed martial arts career

Early career
Uyenoyama had his first mixed martial arts fight in 2002 against Rambaa Somdet, and although he did win his debut, he took a five-year hiatus before returning with another win.

DREAM
Uyenoyama made his DREAM debut against Hideo Tokoro and lost the fight via unanimous decision.

Strikeforce
Uyenoyama made his Strikeforce debut, defeating Andrew Valladerez via a rear-naked choke submission in 59 seconds at Strikeforce: Young Guns.

Uyenoyama moved his Strikeforce record to 2-0 with another first-round submission win with a guillotine choke over Anthony Figueroa.

Uyenoyama's third and final Strikeforce appearance took place at Strikeforce: Destruction. Uyenoyama won via unanimous decision.

Ultimate Fighting Championship
Uyenoyama signed with the Ultimate Fighting Championship in 2011.

Uyenoyama made his bantamweight debut against Japanese superstar Norifumi Yamamoto at UFC on Fox: Velasquez vs. Dos Santos. Uyenoyama defeated heavy favorite Yamamoto via unanimous decision.

Uyenoyama was expected to make his Flyweight debut at UFC on Fox 3 on May 5, 2012 against John Dodson. However, Uyenoyama was forced out of the bout and replaced by promotional newcomer Tim Elliott.

Uyenoyama was expected to face Louis Gaudinot on October 5, 2012 at UFC on FX 5. However, Gaudinot was forced out of the bout with an injury and replaced by promotional newcomer Phil Harris.  Uyenoyama submitted Harris in the second round with a rear-naked choke.

Uyenoyama faced Joseph Benavidez on April 20, 2013 at UFC on Fox 7. Uyenoyama lost the fight via TKO in the second round.

Uyenoyama was expected to face John Moraga on December 14, 2013 at UFC on Fox 9.  However, Moraga pulled out of the bout with an undisclosed injury and was replaced by promotional newcomer Alptekin Özkiliç. Uyenoyama lost the fight via split decision, and was subsequently released from the promotion shortly after.

Post-UFC career
Following his release from the UFC, Uyenoyama signed with Pacific Xtreme Combat in September 2014. He faced Shane Alvarez at PXC 45 on October 24, 2014 and won the fight via ground-and-pound TKO in the first round.

On March 13, 2015 he faced Kentaro Watanabe at PXC 47, winning the fight via split decision.

Uyenoyama challenged Riley Dutro for the vacant PXC Flyweight title on November 18, 2016 at PXC 55, losing the fight by TKO (punches) in the first round.

Personal life
Darren Uyenoyama enjoys surfing and is also a gun enthusiastic.

Coaching
Darren Uyenoyama is currently the head MMA coach at (CSA) Combat Sports Academy in Dublin, CA. He is also the founder, owner and head coach at (FTCC) Faito Tamashii Combat Club in Daly City, CA. He has promoted several grapplers to earn their black belt.  He is known as one of the most decorated grapplers in the Bay area.

Mixed martial arts record

|-
|Loss
|align=center| 10–6
|Riley Dutro
|TKO (punches) 
|Pacific Xtreme Combat 55
|
|align=center| 1
|align=center| 2:46
| Mangilao, Guam
|  
|
|-
| Win
| align=center| 10–5
| Kentaro Watanabe
| Decision (split)
| Pacific Xtreme Combat 47
| 
| align=center| 3
| align=center| 5:00
|  Mangilao, Guam
|
|-
|Win
| align=center| 9–5
| Shane Alvarez
| TKO (punches)
| Pacific Xtreme Combat 45
| 
| align=center| 1
| align=center| N/A
| Mangilao, Guam
|
|-
| Loss
| align=center| 8–5
| Alp Ozkilic
| Decision (split)
| UFC on Fox: Johnson vs. Benavidez 2
| 
| align=center| 3
| align=center| 5:00
| Sacramento, California, United States
| 
|-
| Loss
| align=center| 8–4
| Joseph Benavidez
| TKO (body punch)
| UFC on Fox: Henderson vs. Melendez
| 
| align=center| 2
| align=center| 4:50
| San Jose, California, United States
| 
|-
| Win
| align=center| 8–3
| Phil Harris
| Submission (rear-naked choke)
| UFC on FX: Browne vs. Bigfoot
| 
| align=center| 2
| align=center| 3:38
| Minneapolis, Minnesota, United States
| 
|-
| Win
| align=center| 7–3
| Norifumi Yamamoto
| Decision (unanimous)
| UFC on Fox: Velasquez vs. Dos Santos
| 
| align=center| 3
| align=center| 5:00
| Anaheim, California, United States
| 
|-
| Win
| align=center| 6–3
| Shuichiro Katsumura
| TKO (punches)
| Shooto: The Way of Shooto 5: Like a Tiger, Like a Dragon
| 
| align=center| 2
| align=center| 3:53
| Tokyo, Japan
| 
|-
| Loss
| align=center| 5–3
| Tomoya Miyashita
| Submission (guillotine choke)
| Deep: 47 Impact
| 
| align=center| 2
| align=center| 1:10
| Tokyo, Japan
| 
|-
| Win
| align=center| 5–2
| Brad Royster
| Decision (unanimous)
| Strikeforce: Destruction
| 
| align=center| 3
| align=center| 5:00
| San Jose, California, United States
| 
|-
| Loss
| align=center| 4–2
| Hideo Tokoro
| Decision (unanimous) 
| Dream 4: Middleweight Grand Prix 2008 Second Round
| 
| align=center| 2
| align=center| 5:00
| Yokohama, Kanagawa, Japan
| 
|-
| Win
| align=center| 4–1
| Anthony Figueroa
| Submission (guillotine choke)
| Strikeforce: Shamrock vs. Le
| 
| align=center| 1 
| align=center| 1:27
| San Jose, California, United States
| 
|-
| Win
| align=center| 3–1
| Andrew Valladerez
| Submission (rear-naked choke)
| Strikeforce: Young Guns II
| 
| align=center| 1
| align=center| 0:59
| San Jose, California, United States
| 
|-
| Loss
| align=center| 2–1
| Rolando Velasco
| Decision (unanimous)
| CCFC: Undefeated 
|  
| align=center| 3
| align=center| 5:00
| San Mateo, California, United States
| 
|-
| Win
| align=center| 2–0
| Will Nerbonne
| Submission (rear-naked choke)
| CCFC: Judgement Day
| 
| align=center| 1
| align=center| 2:30
| Santa Rosa, California, United States
| 
|-
| Win
| align=center| 1–0 
| Rambaa Somdet
| Decision (unanimous)
| DEEP: 5th Impact
| 
| align=center| 3 
| align=center| 5:00
| Tokyo, Japan
|

References

External links
 
 

1979 births
Living people
People from South San Francisco, California
Darren Uyenoyama
Featherweight mixed martial artists
Bantamweight mixed martial artists
Flyweight mixed martial artists
Mixed martial artists utilizing collegiate wrestling
Mixed martial artists utilizing Brazilian jiu-jitsu
American practitioners of Brazilian jiu-jitsu
People awarded a black belt in Brazilian jiu-jitsu
American male sport wrestlers
American sportspeople of Japanese descent
Ultimate Fighting Championship male fighters